The Jingdong water snake (Trimerodytes yapingi) is a species of snake in the family Colubridae. It is found in China.

References 

Reptiles described in 2019
Trimerodytes
Reptiles of China